Vernicia montana, the mu oil tree, or chine wood oil tree, is a species of Vernicia in the spurge family, native to Southeast Asia (including Myanmar, Thailand, Vietnam) and southern China. It is a medium-sized deciduous tree reaching a height . The Latin specific epithet montana refers to mountains or coming from mountains.
The leaves are large with three lobes. The monoecious white-petaled flowers emerged as inflorescences, containing both male and female flowers. The  fruit is a globular drupe with wrinkled skin that turns from green to yellow upon ripening. Each fruit contains 3 seeds, rich in oil.

Cultivation and uses
Vernicia montana is grown mostly for the seeds from which a varnish is made similar to the tung tree. The oil is prized as a wood finish. As the tree prefers well drained, sandy soils, the trees are grown on hillside plantations in northern Vietnam. In nature, V montana can be found at the margins of primary forests.

The wood is also harvested.

Gallery

References

 Nguyen, Duong Van. Medicinal Plants of Vietnam, Cambodia and Laos. Santa Monica, CA: Mekong, 1993.

External links

Aleuritideae
Plants described in 1790
Trees of Myanmar
Trees of China
Trees of Taiwan
Trees of Thailand
Trees of Vietnam